All I Want for Christmas may refer to:

Film
 All I Want for Christmas (film), a 1991 film starring Lauren Bacall and Thora Birch
 All I Want for Christmas (2007 film), a 2007 TV film featuring Robert Pine
 All I Want for Christmas Is You (film), a 2017 film starring and produced by Mariah Carey

Music
 "All I Want for Christmas Is You", a 1994 song by Mariah Carey
 "All I Want for Christmas", a song by Shonen Knife
 "All I Want for Christmas", a song by Joss Stone, written and produced by Dan Mackenzie
 "All I Want for Christmas Is a Dukla Prague Away Kit", a song by Half Man Half Biscuit on The Trumpton Riots EP (1986)

Television episodes
 "All I Want for Christmas" (8 Simple Rules)
 "All I Want for Christmas" (Casualty)
 "All I Want for Christmas" (EastEnders)
 "All I Want for Christmas" (Everybody Loves Raymond)
 "All I Want for Christmas" (Fame)
 "All I Want for Christmas" (Happy Days)
 "All I Want for Christmas" (The Jeffersons)
 "All I Want for Christmas" (Newport Harbor: The Real Orange County)
 "All I Want for Christmas" (On Our Own)

See also 
 "All I Want for Christmas Is a Beatle", a 1963 novelty song by Dora Bryan
 "All I Want for Christmas Is My Two Front Teeth", a 1944 song written by Donald Yetter Gardner
 All I Want for Christmas Is You (disambiguation)